Orestes or Orestis is a Greek name, meaning "he who stands on the mountain" or "one who can conquer mountains".

Orestis in Greek mythology is the son of Clytemnestra and Agamemnon, brother of Electra and Iphigenia. He is noted for avenging the murder of his father by killing his mother and her lover Aegisthus, whereafter he was pursued by the Furies and driven mad.

Equivalents in different languages include:

 Aresti - found mostly in the Basque country and the island of Sardinia
 Oreste - Italian
 Orest (Cyrillic: Орест) - Ukrainian (sometimes Oryst in transliteration), Polish and Russian

Given name
Orest Banach (born 1948), American soccer player
Orest Khvolson (1852–1934), Russian physicist
Orest Kindrachuk (born 1950), Canadian ice hockey player
Orest Kiprensky (1782–1836), Russian artist and portraitist
Orest Lenczyk (born 1942), Polish soccer manager
Orest Levytsky (1848–1922), Ukrainian historian
Orest Meleschuk (born 1940), Canadian curler
Orest Miller (1833–1889), Russian folklorist and academic 
Orest Onofrei (born 1957), Romanian veterinarian and politician
Orest Romashyna (born 1946), Canadian ice hockey player
Orest Somov (1793–1833), Ukrainian writer
Orest Subtelny (1941–2016), Canadian historian
Orest Sushko, Canadian sound mixer
Orest Tereshchuk (born 1981), Ukrainian tennis player
Orest Zerebko (1887–1943), Canadian journalist and politician
Oreste Biancoli (1897–1971), Italian screenwriter and film director
Oreste Squinobal (1943–2004), Italian mountain climber and ski mountaineer
Oreste Recchione (1841 - 1904), Italian painter
Oreste Tescari (born 1923), Italian rugby player
Orestes (father of Romulus Augustulus) (died 476), Roman politician and associate of Attila the Hun
Orestes (prefect), a 5th-century official of Alexandria
Orestes of Cappadocia, Christian martyr under Diocletian
Orestes of Jerusalem, Patriarch of Jerusalem 983-1005
Orestes of Macedon, a king in the 4th century BCE
Orestes Brownson (1803–1876), American publisher
Orestes Caviglia (1893–1971), Argentine film director and actor
Orestes A. Crowell (1872–1967), American politician
Orestes Destrade (born 1962), American baseball player
Orestes Garrison (1813–1874), American politician
Orestes Junior Alves (born 1981), Brazilian soccer player
Orestes Kindelán (born 1964), Cuban baseball player
Orestes López (1908–1991), Cuban bandleader
Orestes Quércia (1938–2010), Brazilian politician
Orestes Vilató (born 1944), Cuban-American musician
Orestis Karnezis (born 1985), Greek soccer player
Orestis Laskos (1907–1992), Greek film director, screenwriter and actor
Orestis Makris (1898–1975), Greek actor and tenor
Saint Orestes (died 60 AD), Christian martyr
Oreste Calleja (born 1946), Maltese playwright

References

Given names of Greek language origin
Greek masculine given names